Thomas Blount (May 10, 1759February 7, 1812) was an American soldier, and politician. He served as a lieutenant in the North Carolina Line and as an adjutant general to Major General Richard Caswell in the North Carolina militia during the American Revolutionary War. After the war, he served as a representative in the North Carolina General Assembly and served three terms in U.S. representative from the 5th Congressional District in North Carolina.

Early life
He was born at Blount Hall on May 10, 1759, in Craven County (in the portion of it which became Pitt County in 1760) in the Province of North Carolina. His parents were Jacob Blount of Beaufort County, North Carolina and Barbara Gray Blount. Jacob Blount acquired an estate of six thousand acres on Contentnea Creek between 1757 and 1783. Thomas had six siblings: William (b. 26 Mar. 1749), Ann (b. 3 Oct. 1750), John Gray (b. 21 Sept. 1752), Louisa (b. 17 Jan. 1755), Reading (b. 22 Feb. 1757), and Jacob (b. 5 Nov. 1760). Thomas's mother died in 1763 and his father remarried to Hannah Salter Baker. Thomas was educated at home. He was close to his brothers William and John Gray in both business and politics. Together, they ran the Blount Brothers mercantile business, which was one of the largest in North Carolina and based in Washington, North Carolina. John Gray and William were representatives in the North Carolina General Assembly.

Career

Military service 
In 1777 at the age of 16, Blount entered the Continental Army's 5th North Carolina Regiment during the American Revolutionary War. He served as a lieutenant under Captain Benjamin Stedman. He was dropped from the rolls in January 1778, since he was captured during the conflicts (most likely the Battle of Germantown). He was among those prisoners of war shipped to England for detention. In 1780, he was back in North Carolina and served as Adjutant General to Major General Richard Caswell in the North Carolina militia.

Political career 
He served as a representative from the North Carolina in the United States House of Representatives:
 (17931795), 3rd United States Congress, 9th North Carolina Congressional District, Anti-Administration party affiliation  
 (17951797), 4th United States Congress 9th North Carolina Congressional District
 (17971799), 5th United States Congress 9th North Carolina Congressional District, Democratic-Republican Party 
 1798, lost to Willis Alston in a four-way race for the 9th North Carolina Congressional District (see 1798 United States House of Representatives elections in North Carolina) 
 18051807, 9th United States Congress, 3rd North Carolina Congressional District, Democratic-Republican Party 
 18071809, 10th United States Congress, 3rd North Carolina Congressional District, Democratic-Republican Party 
 18111812, 12th United States Congress, 3rd North Carolina Congressional District, He served until his death in February 1812. He died in Washington, D.C. and was interred at the Congressional Cemetery.

Personal life
He was the brother of William Blount and John Gray Blount and the uncle of William Grainger Blount. His wife, Mary J. Sumner, was the daughter of Jethro Sumner.

His home at Tarboro, The Grove, was listed on the National Register of Historic Places in 1971.

See also
List of United States Congress members who died in office (1790–1899)

References

 Congressional Bio

External links
Biographic sketch at U.S. Congress website

1759 births
1812 deaths
People from Pitt County, North Carolina
Continental Army soldiers from North Carolina
Burials at the Congressional Cemetery
Democratic-Republican Party members of the United States House of Representatives from North Carolina
18th-century American politicians
19th-century American politicians